Drws-y-Nant railway station (Pron: Droos-a-Nant) in Gwynedd, Wales, was formerly a station on the Ruabon to Barmouth line.

The station had two platforms with a passing loop, plus a small goods yard with a dock for loading livestock. According to the Official Handbook of Stations the following classes of traffic were being handled at this station in 1956: G, P, L & H and there was no crane.

Part of the station survives today with two whole platforms, and a nearby crossing cottage. The station is visible from the road near the line.

Neighbouring stations

References

Further reading

Disused railway stations in Gwynedd
Beeching closures in Wales
Railway stations in Great Britain opened in 1868
Railway stations in Great Britain closed in 1965
Brithdir and Llanfachreth
Former Great Western Railway stations